FYM may refer to:
 Farmyard manure
 Fayetteville Municipal Airport (Tennessee), IATA code FYM
 Free Youth Movement (Kurdistan), a Kurdish pro-democracy political movement
 Frontiers for Young Minds, an academic journal aimed at young people
 FYM, a song by Joyner Lucas from the 2017 album 508-507-2209
 FYM, a 2014 song by Jennavive Jackson
 FYM, a 2014 song by Meek Mill
 F.Y.M., a 2021 song by A Day to Remember